Korukonda is a village and panchayat in the Vizianagaram district in Andhra Pradesh, South India. Korukonda has a small railway station in Waltair division of East Coast Railway, Indian Railways.

Demographics

 Total Population: 	5,100 in 1084 Households.
 Male Population: 	2,868
 Female Population: 	2,232
 Children Under 6-years of age: 515 (Boys - 259 and Girls - 256)
 Total Literates: 	2,512

References

Villages in Vizianagaram district